San Isidro Parkway is a 1-mile-long, four-lane divided parkway that traverses east–west in North Laredo, Texas.  Its easternmost terminal point is the intersection of International Blvd and itself.  The  westernmost terminal point is currently a few feet west of Spendrift Road.  Recently, construction has begun again on expansion of the roadway towards the west.  Eventually, San Isidro Parkway will connect to I-35 somewhere between Shiloh Blvd. and Loop 20.   The only major road that it crosses is McPherson Rd.

Places along San Isidro Parkway
 Doctors Hospital of Laredo
 United Day School

Transportation in Laredo, Texas